Vladislav Vasilievich Biryukov (born 15 September 1972) — Russian mineralogist and journalist, editor-in-chief and an author of Computerra weekly.

Biography 

 1989—1994 — studied at geologic facultet of Moscow State University
 since 1998 — prints in Computerra
 1999—2008 — the head of news department in Computerra
 since 2008 — editor-in-chief of Computerra

External links 
 Vladislav Biryukov's articles (in Russian)

1972 births
Living people
Russian journalists
Russian magazine editors
Moscow State University alumni